Elections in Punjab may refer to:

Elections in Punjab (India)
Elections in Punjab (Pakistan)